Bluegiga Technologies Ltd. known as Bluegiga, is a Finnish wireless technology company based in Espoo, Finland. Founded in 2000, it has since expanded its offices to Atlanta in USA and Hong Kong. Bluegiga has been a member of the Bluetooth Special Interest Group since it was established and joined Continua Health Alliance in Spring 2008. The company joined Wi-Fi Alliance in the beginning of 2012.

Products

Bluegiga develops and manufactures short range wireless connectivity systems, including Bluetooth modules and access servers, Wi-Fi modules, Bluetooth Smart modules as well as a licencable embedded Bluetooth stack, . The products are mainly aimed at adding wireless connectivity to industrial customers' products, rather than being consumer-ready end products by themselves. Common industry sectors that use Bluegiga's products include, Healthcare, automotive, audio, industrial and consumer applications.

Acquisitions 

In February 2015, Bluegiga was acquired by Silicon Labs.

See also
 Michael Kroll's project pages
 Suresh Joshi's Bluegiga-related development pages

References

News articles 

Electronics companies of Finland